Karachi Metropolitan Corporation is a public corporation and governing body to provide municipal services in most of Karachi, the largest city of Pakistan.

History

1852 
Karachi Conservancy Board was established to control cholera epidemics in Karachi during British rule in 1846. The board was upgraded into the Municipal Commission in 1852.

1853 
In 1853 the Municipal Commission was turned into Karachi Municipal Committee. The foundation stone of the Karachi Municipal Corporation Building was laid on Bandar Road in 1927.

1933 

In 1933 the Karachi Municipal Committee was upgraded to the Karachi Municipal Corporation by the Karachi Municipal Act.

1976 
The Karachi Municipal Corporation was turned into the Karachi Metropolitan Corporation in 1976.

1987 
Zonal Municipal Committees were established in 1987. The zonal committees were merged again into the Karachi Metropolitan Corporation. Five district municipal corporations were established in 1987.

2000 
The Karachi Metropolitan Corporation was abolished in 2000 and five district municipal corporations were merged into City District Karachi. The City District Karachi was divided into 18 town and 178 union councils.

2011 
In 2011 Sindh Government restored again Karachi Metropolitan Corporation and five district municipal corporations.

2015 
In 2015, the Karachi Metropolitan Corporation consisted of 305 members, including 209 general members and chairmen of union committees, and 96 reserved members.

The numbers of KMC council members since 1979 is as follows:

Budget 
KMC and Karachi budget formulated by its mayors and administrators during their tenure.

See also

Karachi Development Authority
Administrator Karachi
Commissioner Karachi
Mayor of Karachi
Karachi Conservancy Board
 Karachi Municipal Commission
 Karachi Municipal Committee
 City District Government of Karachi
 Government of Karachi

References

External links 
 

Government of Karachi
Companies based in Karachi
1846 establishments in British India
Metropolitan corporations in Pakistan